Kaplický is a Czech surname. It's bearers include:
 Jan Kaplický (1937-2009), Czech architect
 Václav Kaplický (1895-1982), Czech writer

See also 
 chapel
 kaplička (cs)
 Kaplice (cs)

Czech-language surnames